

"Cascade Lake-SP" (14 nm) Scalable Performance 

 Support for up to 12 DIMMs of DDR4 memory per CPU socket
 Xeon Platinum supports up to eight sockets; Xeon Gold supports up to four sockets; Xeon Silver and Bronze support up to two sockets
 No suffix letter: up to 1.0TB DDR4 per socket
 -L: Large DDR memory  tier support (up to 4.5TB)
 -M: Medium DDR memory tier support (up to 2.0TB)
 -N: Network & NFV specialized
 -R: Refresh (higher performance)
 -S: Search value specialized
 -T: High thermal-case and extended reliability
 -U: Uniprocessor
 -V: VM density value specialized
 -Y: Speed select

Xeon Gold (uniprocessor)

Xeon Bronze and Silver (dual processor)

Xeon Gold (dual processor)

Xeon Gold (quad processor)

Xeon Platinum (octa processor)

"Cascade Lake-AP" (14 nm) Advanced Performance 
 Support up to two sockets
 2 dies per socket

Xeon Platinum (dual processor)

"Cascade Lake-W" (14 nm)

Xeon W-22xx (uniprocessor) 
 All models support: MMX, SSE, SSE2, SSE3, SSSE3, SSE4.1, SSE4.2, AVX, AVX2, AVX-512, FMA3, MPX, Enhanced Intel SpeedStep Technology (EIST), Intel 64, XD bit (an NX bit implementation), Intel VT-x, Intel VT-d, Turbo Boost, Hyper-threading, AES-NI, Intel TSX-NI, Smart Cache, DL Boost.
 PCI Express lanes: 48
 Supports up to 8 DIMMs of DDR4 memory, maximum 1 TB.

Xeon W-32xx (uniprocessor) 
 PCI Express lanes: 64
 Supports up to 12 DIMMs of DDR4 memory, maximum 1 TB.
 -M: Medium DDR memory tier support (up to 2 TB)

References 

Intel Xeon (Cascade Lake)